YNE, or similar, may refer to:
 -yne, a suffix used in organic chemistry for names of alkynes
 Lang'e language, a Loloish language of Yunnan, China
 Norway House Airport, Norway House, Manitoba, Canada